Angustassiminea succinea is a species of minute operculate snail, a terrestrial gastropod mollusk or micromollusk in the family Assimineidae.

Description 
The maximum recorded shell length is 3 mm.

Distribution and habitat
Angustassiminea succinea has been found in Mexico, Belize, northern South America, and on the western shores of the Atlantic Ocean and the Caribbean Sea.The maximum recorded depth is 4m.

References

 Lea, H.C. (1845). A description of some new species of marine shells inhabiting the coast of the United States. Proceedings of the Boston Society of Natural History, 1: 204-205
 Abbott R. T. (1974). American seashells. The marine Mollusca of the Atlantic and Pacific coast of North America. ed. 2. Van Nostrand, New York. 663 pp., 24 pls.

External links
 Pfeiffer L. (1840). Uebersicht der im Januar, Februar und März, 1839 auf Cuba gesammelten Mollusken. Archiv für Naturgeschichte. 6: 250-264
  Rosenberg, G.; Moretzsohn, F.; García, E. F. (2009). Gastropoda (Mollusca) of the Gulf of Mexico, Pp. 579–699 in: Felder, D.L. and D.K. Camp (eds.), Gulf of Mexico–Origins, Waters, and Biota. Texas A&M Press, College Station, Texas
 Rosenberg, G. 2004. Malacolog Version 3.3.2: Western Atlantic gastropod database. The Academy of Natural Sciences, Philadelphia, PA.

Assimineidae
Gastropods described in 1840